Robert Cassius Wright (December 13, 1891 – July 30, 1993) was an American right-handed professional baseball pitcher. He played two games in Major League Baseball for the Chicago Cubs in 1915. He was born in Decatur County, Indiana and died in Carmichael, California.

Notes

References 

Major League Baseball pitchers
Chicago Cubs players
Kankakee Kanks players
Memphis Chickasaws players
Toledo Mud Hens players
Baseball players from Indiana
American centenarians
Men centenarians
People from Decatur County, Indiana
1891 births
1993 deaths
Virginia Ore Diggers players